William James Broughton (6 January 1913 – 23 September 1990) was a New Zealand jockey. He was born in Foxton, New Zealand, on 6 January 1913.

During his career, Broughton rode 1,446 winners in New Zealand, and a further 11 in Australia, including three Wellington Cups and two New Zealand Cups.

He won the jockey premiership for the most winners in a racing season in New Zealand on 11 occasions.

In 1996, Broughton was posthumously inducted into the New Zealand Sports Hall of Fame and in 2006 into the New Zealand Racing Hall of Fame.

See also

 Thoroughbred racing in New Zealand

References 

1913 births
1990 deaths
People from Foxton, New Zealand
New Zealand jockeys
New Zealand Racing Hall of Fame inductees
20th-century New Zealand people